The Glasflügel BS-1, sometimes called the Björn Stender BS-1 or the Stender BS-1, is a West German, high-wing, single seat, T-tailed, FAI Open Class glider that was designed by Björn Stender and produced by Glasflügel.

Design and development
The prototype BS-1 was designed by Stender as the initials indicate; the BS-1 was closely based on his earlier Akaflieg Braunschweig SB-6 Nixope, produced whilst he was still an undergraduate. Two prototypes were built by him and his three assistants in 1962. He was then a young engineering student and designed the aircraft at the request of a South African sailplane pilot and industrialist, producing a design that was very advanced for its time. While the designer was test flying of one of the prototypes in 1963 the aircraft suffered an in-flight structural failure and Stender was killed. Glasflügel then took over the project and re-engineered the design, based on their experience producing the Glasflügel H-301 Libelle. The company went on to build 18 production aircraft.

The BS-1 is constructed entirely from fiberglass and features an  wing with flaps and dive brakes. For further glidepath control the BS-1 has a tail-mounted parachute. The landing gear is a retractable monowheel.

A planned improved model, the BS-1b, was never produced.

Operational history
The BS-1 was considered one of the first soaring "super ships" and was one of the most high-performing gliders of its time, the mid-1960s. Thierry Thys of San Leandro, California flew a BS-1 on a  flight in 1970. At that time it was the third-longest soaring flight ever made.

Aircraft on display

Frontiers of Flight Museum
National Soaring Museum - one, listed as in "storage"

Specifications (BS-1)

See also

References

External links

1960s German sailplanes
Glasflügel aircraft
T-tail aircraft
Aircraft first flown in 1962